Llançà is a municipality in the comarca of the Alt Empordà in Catalonia, Spain. It is situated on the coastline of the Costa Brava, between the Cap de Creus and the French frontier and is an important fishing port and tourist centre. The N-260 connects the town with Figueres and continues on to the border at Portbou.

The GR 92 long distance footpath, which roughly follows the length of the Mediterranean coast of Spain, has a staging point at Llançà.

Demographics

References

 Panareda Clopés, Josep Maria; Rios Calvet, Jaume; Rabella Vives, Josep Maria (1989). Guia de Catalunya, Barcelona: Caixa de Catalunya.  (Spanish).  (Catalan).

External links 
Official website
 Government data pages 

Municipalities in Alt Empordà
Populated places in Alt Empordà